Abdul Karim Ayeh (born 25 October 2003) is a Ghanaian professional footballer who plays as forward for Ghanaian Premier League side Bechem United F.C.

Career 
Ayeh started his professional career with Bechem United and was promoted to the senior team ahead of the 2020–21 season. On 29 January 2021, he made his debut after starting and playing 45 minutes in a 3–1 win over Techiman Eleven Wonders.

References

External links 

 

Living people
2003 births
Association football forwards
Ghanaian footballers
Bechem United F.C. players